Andere Tijden (Other/Different Times) is a history programme on Dutch television of the NTR and VPRO. There is also a version of the programme called Andere Tijden Sport, which shows programmes about sports history. Andere Tijden is currently presented by Astrid Sy and Andere Tijden Sport by Tom Egbers.

References

External links 
 Andere Tijden website
 Andere Tijden Sport website

Dutch documentary television series
Dutch-language television shows
NPO 3 original programming